Niranjani Shanmugaraja also known as Niranjani Shanmugarajah is a Sri Lankan award-winning actress in Sri Lankan Sinhalese and Tamil Cinema. She also works as a television host in Sri Lanka Rupavahini Corporation.

Career
She made her acting debut in the award-winning drama film Ini Avan as a supporting actress which starred Darshan Dharmaraj and Subashini Balasubramaniyam in the lead roles. She was awarded the Best supporting actress for the film, Ini Avan for her critically acclaimed performance as a civilian in the movie during the Hiru Golden Film Award held in 2014. Also she won Best Actress award at Derana lux film awards 2013. She played the role of lead actress for the first time in the Tamil film, Komaali Kings which is considered as a landmark movie in Sri Lankan Tamil cinema after being released in 2018.

In 2021, she appeared in the Raffealla Fernando Celebrity Calendar along with many other Sri Lankan celebrities. In the same year, she won the award for the Best Actress at BAYELSA International Film Festival for her role in the 2020 film Tsunami.

Filmography

See also 
 Sri Lankan Tamils in Sinhala Cinema

References

External links 

Date of birth missing (living people)
Sri Lankan film actresses
21st-century Sri Lankan actresses
Sri Lankan Tamil actresses
Living people
Year of birth missing (living people)